Bert Fish (October 8, 1875July 21, 1943) was an American lawyer, judge, philanthropist, and ambassador.

Early life
Fish originally hailed from Bedford, Indiana, but moved to Volusia County, Florida in 1881.  He became the Superintendent of the Volusia County Schools district when he was 25, and went on to study at Stetson Law School and becoming a founding member of Stetson University's Sigma Nu chapter, graduating and being admitted to the Florida bar in 1902.  Fish then joined a law partnership in DeLand, and from 1904 to 1910 served as a judge.

Politics and diplomacy
Fish was the finance director of the Democratic National Committee and Franklin Roosevelt's Florida Campaign Manager during the 1932 presidential election and a reputed friend of Senator Claude Pepper.

Upon Roosevelt's victory, Fish received the ambassadorship to Egypt, being appointed on September 6, 1933, and presenting his credentials December 2, 1933; because his appointment came while the Senate was in recess, he was subsequently confirmed on January 15, 1934 and recommissioned.

In 1935 Stetson University bestowed an honorary LL.D. degree on Fish.

Though still residing in Cairo, Fish was appointed the first U.S. ambassador to Saudi Arabia on August 7, 1939, presenting his credentials on February 4, 1940. He left both assignments on February 28, 1941. That February he took a steamer down the Red Sea to Jidda, Saudi Arabia, where he gave a silver-framed photograph of Roosevelt to King Ibn Saud and was treated to a banquet by Prince Faisal.

Even before terminating these assignments, Fish was appointed as Envoy Extraordinary and Minister Plenipotentiary to Portugal on February 11, 1941, and presented credentials on March 26, 1941. While at his new post he became ill, and died just two weeks later on July 21, 1943.

The American diplomat and historian George F. Kennan who served under Bert Fish in Lisbon, in his memoirs, describes Fish as a shrewd and amiable diplomat but placid and inactive, spending most of his days in an armchair in his room and seldom appearing at the legation chancery.

Legacy 
Bert Fish was recognized as a "Great Floridian" with a commemorative plaque for significant contributions to the history and culture of Florida. His Great Floridian plaque is located at the Fish Building, 100 North Woodland Boulevard, DeLand.

References

External links
Bert Fish Medical Center
Fish's webpage, Office of the Historian

1875 births
1943 deaths
People from Bedford, Indiana
People from DeLand, Florida
Ambassadors of the United States to Egypt
Ambassadors of the United States to Saudi Arabia
Ambassadors of the United States to Portugal
Stetson University College of Law alumni
Florida Democrats
Democratic National Committee people